Ann-Sophie Lennerfors (born 16 November 1970) is a Swedish TV personality and film critic who lives and works in Japan, best known under the stage name LiLiCo.

Biography

Early life
LiLiCo was born Ann-Sophie Lennerfors in Stockholm, Sweden, to a Japanese mother and a Swedish father. As a biracial child in Sweden, LiLiCo was bullied while at school. Her father left the family when LiLiCo was 9 years old.

Career in Japan

LiLiCo moved to Japan in 1988 at the age of 18, initially staying with her grandmother in Katsushika, Tokyo. In May 1989, LiLiCo embarked on a career as a singer, releasing her first single in 1992. In 2001, she was offered a job as a film critic on TBS's Saturday morning King's Brunch programme.

Professional wrestling
In 2014, LiLiCo began working for Japanese professional wrestling company DDT Pro-Wrestling (DDT), where, over the next three years, she won the Ironman Heavymetalweight Championship twice and the DDT Extreme Championship once, while also becoming part of the inaugural KO-D 10-Man Tag Team Champions.

After having fractured her patella in 2020, forcing her to give up wrestling, LiLiCo was invited back to DDT to have a retirement match on March 20, 2022, at Judgement 2022: DDT 25th Anniversary.

Filmography

Cinema
 Kiki's Delivery Service (2014), voice of radio DJ
 Smokin' on the Moon (2018)
 108: Revenge and Adventure of Goro Kaiba (2019), Adrianne
 Niwatori Phoenix (2022)
 Let's Talk About the Old Times (2022), herself

TV drama
  (2014, TV Tokyo), Ryoko Azuma

Dubbing
LiLiCo voices the character of Eric Cartman in the Japanese version of the American animated series South Park. She also voiced Margaux Needler in the dub of the 2019 animated adaptation of The Addams Family, Mrs. Wiggins in the dub of the 2012 animated adaptation of The Lorax, Vera Lorraine Dinkle in the dub of the 2009 animated film Mary and Max, and Vera in A Turtle's Tale: Sammy's Adventures. She dubbed over Salma Hayek as Madame Truska in Cirque du Freak: The Vampire's Assistant.

Bibliography
  (2007, Goma Books), 
 I Love Sweden (2008, Goma Books), 
  (2010, Kodansha),

Championships and accomplishments 
 DDT Pro-Wrestling
DDT Extreme Championship (1 time)
Ironman Heavymetalweight Championship (2 times)
KO-D 10-Man Tag Team Championship (1 time) – with Ken Ohka, Ladybeard, Makoto Oishi and Super Sasadango Machine

References

External links
 Official agency profile 
 Official blog 
 

Sportspeople from Stockholm
Swedish expatriates in Japan
Japanese television personalities
Japanese film critics
Living people
1970 births
Swedish female professional wrestlers
Japanese female professional wrestlers
Swedish people of Japanese descent
Japanese people of Swedish descent
21st-century professional wrestlers
DDT Extreme Champions
Ironman Heavymetalweight Champions
KO-D 8-Man/10-Man Tag Team Champions